The U.S. Post Office is a historic building in El Paso, Texas. It was built in 1916, and designed in the Beaux Arts architectural style. The lobby is "topped by a massive, paneled, saucer-shaped dome", and the rest of the lobby includes "polished marble" and "huge, rounded, ornamental grills of bronze." The building has been listed on the National Register of Historic Places since July 19, 1984.

References

Beaux-Arts architecture in Texas
Buildings and structures completed in 1916
Buildings and structures in El Paso, Texas
National Register of Historic Places in El Paso County, Texas
Post office buildings on the National Register of Historic Places in Texas